Przemysław Jacek Bobak (born 1974) is a Polish diplomat who serves an ambassador of Poland to Ethiopia (since 2020).

Life 
Przemysław Bobak has finished SGH Warsaw School of Economics. He has been studying also at the Central European University in Budapest and at the University of Geneva.

In 2001 he started his diplomatic career at the Ministry of Foreign Affairs. Following his internships at the embassy in London, United Kingdom and at the permanent representation to the OECD in Paris, France he joined the MFA Department of Africa and the Middle East. Between 2004 and 2006 he has been working at the embassy in Nairobi, Kenya as Third Secretary responsible for economic and development cooperation in Kenya, Uganda, Rwanda, Burundi, cooperating with the United Nations Human Settlements Programme (UN-HABITAT) and United Nations Environment Programme (UNEP). Since 2006 he was working at the UN-HABITAT office in Warsaw being in charge of Central, East and South European countries. In 2009, he returned to the MFA; firstly, Eastern Department, later, Political Director's Office as a deputy director. Between 2013 and 2017 he was at the embassy in Tel Aviv responsible for scientific, technology, tourist matters. In 2017, back in Warsaw, after a couple of months as First Councellor at the Economic Cooperation Department, in February 2018 he became the director of the Department of Africa and the Middle East. On 21 July 2020, he was appointed Poland Ambassador to Ethiopia, additionally accredited to Djibouti, South Sudan and the African Union. He has been responsible for relations with the Intergovernmental Authority on Development and United Nations Economic Commission for Africa, as well. He took his post on 6 September 2020, and presented credentials to the president Sahle-Work Zewde on 16 October 2020.

Besides Polish, he speaks English and French.

Honours 

 Silver Cross of Merit (2019)

References 

1974 births
Ambassadors of Poland to Ethiopia
Central European University alumni
Living people
Polish officials of the United Nations
Recipients of the Silver Cross of Merit (Poland)
SGH Warsaw School of Economics alumni